The Santa María class of guided missile frigates is the Spanish Navy's designation for six warships based on the United States s. Spanish ships have a slightly bigger beam and were built with a greater weight reserve for future improvements. Other changes from the basic model include Meroka replacing Phalanx and a RAN-12L air search radar to provide low horizon coverage against sea skimmers cueing the Meroka CIWS mount. The Nettunel EW suite (based on the Italian Nettuno built in Spain) replaced the SLQ-32 system fitted aboard US ships. The first ship  entered service in 1986.

Design and description

The Santa María class are a series of six guided missile frigates based on the American s. The Oliver Hazard Perry class had been conceived as a way to reduce unit costs while maintaining an anti-air warfare (AAW) platform with anti-submarine (ASW) and anti-surface warfare capabilities. The Oliver Hazard Perry class came in two forms, the short-hulled and long-hulled, with the Santa María class being of the later with additional beam to allow for more top weight for future modifications. The class came in two batches, with the first four being of batch one and the final two of the second. The ships have a complement of 223 sailors including 13 officers.

The ships have four 1,000 kW Kato-Allison 114-DOOL diesel generator sets creating a total of 4,000 kW. These can power two  retractable, rotatable auxiliary propulsion motors. The vessels have fin stabilisers fitted.

Armament and sensors
Frigates of the Santa María class are armed with a single-armed Mk 13 missile launcher serviced by a 40-round magazine that can handle 32 SM-1MR anti-air/ship missiles and 8 Harpoon anti-ship missiles. For ASW, the frigates are armed with two triple-mounted Mark 32 torpedo tubes for  Mod 5 Mark 46 torpedoes.

The vessels are equipped with AN/SPS-49(V)4 2-D air search ((V)5 in Navarra and Canarias) radar, RAN-12L (being replaced by RAN-30) 2-D low horizon air search radar for the Meroka CIWS, SPS-55 surface search radar and a Mk 92 fire-control radar. For ASW, the ships have SQS-56 sonar, SQR-19(V) towed array (-19(V)2 in Navarra and Canarias). For weapons fire control, they have Mk 13 weapons control, Mk 92 and SPG-60 STIR missile control, SQQ-89 ASW systems. For electronic warfare they have Nettunel (Navarra and Canarias: Mk-3000) intercept, a SLQ-25 Nixie towed torpedo decoy, and Mk36 SROC decoy launchers.

Aircraft
As long-hulled versions of the Oliver Hazard Perry class, the Santa María-class frigates have twin hangars to accommodate up to two Sikorsky SH-60B Seahawk Light Airborne Multi-Purpose System (LAMPS) III helicopters though only one is usually embarked. The helicopter deck, located aft, is equipped with the RAST helicopter deck-handling system designed to handle LAMPS helicopters.

Construction and service

The first three ships were ordered on 29 June 1977. Delays in construction followed as the Spanish Navy deferred the frigates' construction in order to focus on the construction of a new aircraft carrier  The fourth hull was ordered on 19 June 1986, and the final two on 26 December 1989. Santa María was the first of the class to enter service in 1986. In August 1991  Santa María was among the Spanish ships deployed to the Persian Gulf and Red Sea as part of the International Force following the invasion of Kuwait by Iraq. She was later replaced by sister ship Numancia in November. By 1994 all six vessels were active and are homeported at Rota, Spain as part of the 41st Escort Squadron.

Units of class

Notes

Citations

References

External links

 MaritimeQuest Oliver Hazard Perry Class Overview
 BUQUESDEGUERRA.TK, a Spanish website about warships

Frigate classes
Ships of the Spanish Navy
Santa María-class frigates